Baçal is a civil parish in the municipality of Bragança, Portugal. The population in 2011 was 484, in an area of 28.37 km².

References

Parishes of Bragança, Portugal